Kandieng is a district in Pursat province, Cambodia. The district capital is at Kandieng town located about 12 km from the Provincial capital Pursat.

Location
Kandieng shares a border with the districts of Bakan to the west, Sampov Meas to the south and Krakor to the east. The northern part of the district encompasses a portion of the Tonle Sap lake and there is one settlement on the edge of the lake at Reang Til. This is a Tonle Sap floating village and the location moves depending on the water level in the lake.

According to the 1998 Census, Kandieng district is made up of 9 communes and 113 villages. The population of the district was 53,335 in 10,148 households at the time of the last census.

Administration 
The following table shows the villages of Kandieng district by commune.

Characteristics
Kandieng is home to several villages of traditional sculptors who work in marble. Buddhist statues and animal carvings are in strong demand and pieces from Kandieng are sold as far away as Phnom Penh and Siem Reap. The marble is quarried in the Cardamom Mountains in Veal Veang district and often transported to Kandieng via oxcart. In these villages marble carving is a skill that has been handed down through families over generations.

Although there are many execution sites in Pursat, Kandieng is also home to one of the major execution sites (sometimes called killing fields) of the Khmer Rouge in Pursat province. It is located near Srae Sdok about 6 kilometres from the Tonle Sap. The Tuol Purchrey killing site was a military fort for government soldiers during the Lon Nol period. Systematic executions were carried out at Tuol Purchrey from 1975 until 1978. People were transported to the site in large trucks, ordered out, tied up at gun point, and marched to be killed. Local researchers who visited and mapped the site interviewing surviving eyewitnesses estimated that over 10,000 people were executed here over 3 years.

References

Districts of Pursat province